Shirin is a city in Sirdaryo Region of Uzbekistan. Shirin is administratively designated as a city of regional significance, not part of a district. Near Shirin, there is Syrdarya Power Plant and Farkhad Dam. Its population is 18,900 (2021).

History 

The city was established in 1972.

The history of the city begins with a construction of power station in the early Syrdarinskaya 1970 - one of the largest power plants in the former Soviet Union.

Prior to the establishment of the city the vicinity had small rural settlements.

References

Populated places in Sirdaryo Region
Cities in Uzbekistan